Melody Maker Cancún is a hotel and resort located in the Hotel Zone (Zona Hotelera) in Cancun, Mexico. The hotel is part of the Melody Maker brand name and is owned and operated by Be Live Hotels.

See also
 List of hotels in Mexico
 List of companies of Mexico

Notes

External links
Melody Maker Cancún Official Website

Cancún
Hotels in Mexico
Hotels established in 2006
Hotel buildings completed in 2006